Aguias Guine No Lanta is a Guinea-Bissauan football club based in Lanta. They play in the 2 division in Guinean football, the Campeonato Nacional da da 2ª Divisão da Guine-Bissau.

References

Aguias Guine No Lanta